The 2021–22 Gibraltar National League season was the third season of the Gibraltar National League in Gibraltar, and the 123rd season of football on the territory overall. The league kicked off on 16 October 2021. Lincoln Red Imps were the reigning champions, winning the title on the final day of the 2020–21 season.

Format
The structure of the league was expected to follow that of the previous two seasons. Teams played one round of games as a single league, before splitting into two groups: the Championship Group contested by the top 6 sides, and the Challenge Group between the bottom 5 sides. The winners of the Challenge Group received the GFA Challenge Trophy and a bye to the second round of the next season's Rock Cup.

Teams

The following 11 teams competed in the 2021–22 season. Boca Gibraltar were expelled from the league in December 2020 and did not return.

Note: Flags indicate national team as has been defined under FIFA eligibility rules. Players may hold more than one non-FIFA nationality.

Managerial Changes

League table

Results

Championship and Challenge groups

Championship Group

Championship Group results

Challenge Group

Challenge Group results

Season statistics

Scoring

Top scorers

Hat-tricks

Clean Sheets

See also
2021–22 Gibraltar Intermediate League
2021–22 Gibraltar Women's Football League

References

External links
Gibraltar Football Association

Gibraltar National League seasons
Gib
1